The Globe KD5G is a pulsejet-powered American target drone produced by Globe Aircraft Corporation that began development in 1949. Due to changing requirements for drone performance, it was only operated by the United States Navy for a short period.

Design and development
The XKD5G-1 was of conventional high-wing, twin-tail design, a Marquardt PJ46 pulsejet being mounted externally atop the fuselage, in the same style as the World War II German V-1; it was one of the last aircraft produced for the U.S. military to be powered by a pulsejet.

Operational history
Originating in 1949, the XKD5G-1 first flew in 1950, and was tested at the Naval Air Test Center in Point Mugu, California. By 1952, however, the speed requirements for target drones had increased to the point that the KD5G was considered too slow for operational service, while pulsejets also lost efficiency quickly at higher altitudes; as a result the XKD5G-1 project was cancelled.

Surviving aircraft
A surviving XKD5G-1 was donated to the National Air and Space Museum by the U.S. Navy in 1966; it is displayed in the Steven F. Udvar-Hazy Center.

Specifications (KD5G-1)

See also

References

1940s United States special-purpose aircraft
Unmanned aerial vehicles of the United States
Pulsejet-powered aircraft
KD5G
High-wing aircraft
Single-engined jet aircraft
Twin-tail aircraft